Warka Bank for Investment & Finance is an Iraqi commercial bank, with headquarters in Baghdad.

The bank has 120 branches in Baghdad and all the Iraqi governorates.

See also
Iraqi dinar

External links
 Official website

Companies based in Baghdad
Banks of Iraq
Iraqi companies established in 1999